Eomesodon is an extinct genus of prehistoric ray-finned fish. It lived during the Late Triassic and Jurassic.

See also

 Prehistoric fish
 List of prehistoric bony fish

References

Pycnodontiformes genera
Triassic bony fish
Late Triassic fish
Jurassic bony fish
Triassic fish of Europe